To My Son is an album by vibraphonist Walt Dickerson recorded in 1978 for the SteepleChase label.

Reception

Allmusic gave the album 3 stars.

Track listing
All compositions by Walt Dickerson
 "You Can" – 11:31
 "You Will" – 9:16
 "It Is Done" – 8:08
 "Thank You Son" – 11:15

Personnel 
Walt Dickerson – vibraphone
Andy McKee – bass
Jimmi Johnsun – drums

References 

1980 albums
Walt Dickerson albums
SteepleChase Records albums